Tilloclytus clavipes is a species of longhorn beetle in the Cerambycinae subfamily. It was described by Bates in 1885. It is known from Guatemala.

References

Anaglyptini
Beetles described in 1885